The R195 road is a regional road in Ireland linking Castlepollard in County Westmeath to Virginia in County Cavan. It passes through the town of Oldcastle, County Meath and several villages and hamlets en route.

See also
Roads in Ireland
National primary road
National secondary road

References
Roads Act 1993 (Classification of Regional Roads) Order 2006 – Department of Transport

Regional roads in the Republic of Ireland
Roads in County Meath
Roads in County Westmeath
Roads in County Cavan